Pablo Martínez (born 12 December 1997) is a Spanish canoeist. He competed in the men's C-2 1000 metres event at the 2020 Summer Olympics.

References

1997 births
Living people
Spanish male canoeists
Olympic canoeists of Spain
Canoeists at the 2020 Summer Olympics
Place of birth missing (living people)
ICF Canoe Sprint World Championships medalists in Canadian
21st-century Spanish people